Dame Anita Margaret Frew  is a Scottish businesswoman and Chairman of Croda.

Early life
Frew graduated from University of Strathclyde. She also earned a master of research in Philosophy from the University of London.

Career
On graduation she joined Royal Bank of Scotland, before moving to Scottish Provident where she served as Head of UK Investment. Frew then became Director of Corporate Development at WPP plc. She also founded an investor relations consultancy, Frew McMaster.

She progressed to become a non-executive director of various commercial organisations including WPP plc and Northumbrian Water as well as Non-Executive Chairman of Victrex and pro bono non-executive director roles in various artistic organisations, including the Donmar Warehouse and the Gate Theatre.

Frew was appointed Dame Commander of the Order of the British Empire (DBE) in the 2023 New Year Honours for services to business and the economy.

Directorships
Frew is a non-executive director of: Lloyds Banking Group; Aberdeen Asset Management; Ansbacher Holdings; Securities Trust of Scotland; Northumbrian Water; Abbott Mead Vickers BBDO; STOS plc; The City of London Investment Trust Plc; Archant; and NXT Plc.

References

Living people
Alumni of the University of Strathclyde
Scottish chairpersons of corporations
British corporate directors
1957 births
Croda International people
Dames Commander of the Order of the British Empire